Planters Bank Building may refer to:

Planters Bank Building (Osceola, Arkansas), listed on the National Register of Historic Places in Mississippi County, Arkansas
Planters Bank Building (Jefferson, Texas), listed on the National Register of Historic Places in Marion County, Texas